= We All Think We're Special =

2021 American film

- Directed by: Kirby Voss
- Written by: Felicia Stallard; Kirby Voss
- Produced by: John Swider; Kirby Voss
- Starring: Jared Bankens; William McGovern; Sherri Marina
- Cinematography: Aaron J. Ryder
- Edited by: Eva K. Morgan
- Distributed by: Cinema Epoch
- Release date: June 4, 2021
- Running time: 91 minutes
- Country: United States
- Language: English
- Budget: $74,922

We All Think We're Special is a 2021 American thriller film co-written, and directed by Kirby Voss. It stars Jared Bankens, and William McGovern. The film was released on DVD and digital platforms by Cinema Epoch on June 4, 2021.

== Plot ==
The plot revolves around two childhood friends, Charlie (Jared Bankens) and Ed (William McGovern), who have a night of reckless drinking. The next morning, Ed decides that Charlie must go through detox, no matter the cost.

== Cast ==
- Jared Bankens as Charlie
- William McGovern as Ed
- Eli Barron as Teen Charlie
- Caleb Caldcleugh as Teen Ed
